Peter Kennedy (born 20 April 1965) is a New Zealand cricketer. He played in 47 first-class and 25 List A matches for Canterbury from 1985 to 1992.

See also
 List of Canterbury representative cricketers

References

External links
 

1965 births
Living people
New Zealand cricketers
Canterbury cricketers
Cricketers from Christchurch